The 2017 SWF Scottish Cup is the national cup competition in Scottish women's football. All teams in the Scottish Women's Football League and SWPL 1 & 2 are eligible to enter.

Quarter-finals
Teams in Bold advanced to the semi-finals.

Sources:

Semi-finals
Teams in Bold advanced to the final.

Sources:

Final
The final was played on Sunday, 26 November 2017 at the Tony Macaroni Arena, Livingston, West Lothian.

Hibernian won the final 3–0 against Glasgow City. It was their second Scottish Cup win in a row, defeating the same opposition. During the match, Hibs player Siobhan Hunter struck a 40-yard free kick into the top right corner of the Glasgow City goal for the second of the match; it won the Women's Soccer United goal of the month trophy.

References

Scottish Women's Cup
Scottish Women's Cup